Silvia Fontana (born December 3, 1976) is a former figure skater who represented Italy twice at the Winter Olympics.

Career
Fontana began skating at age four. She began representing Italy in the 1993-94 season international competition. During her career, she won five national titles. She finished as high as 7th at the European Championships and 8th at Worlds. She finished 10th at the 2002 Winter Olympics in Salt Lake City. Following 2002, Fontana left competitive skating. She made a comeback in the 2005-06 season, hoping to skate at the Olympics in her home country of Italy. Her 2nd-place finish at the Italian Nationals qualified her for Italy's Olympic team. She placed 22nd in her final competitive event.

Following the Olympics, Fontana performed in ice shows around the world, as well as a skating competition on Italian TV. She coaches at TGH Ice Plex in Brandon, Florida with John Zimmerman. Their students include Haven Denney / Brandon Frazier. and currently Vanessa James / Morgan Ciprès.

SafeSport investigation
In December 2019, Fontana and Zimmerman, were named and accused in a United States Center for SafeSport investigation of covering up alleged sexual abuse committed by Ciprès via intimidation tactics. Fontana received six months of probation, according to the person with knowledge of the investigation.

Personal life
Fontana was born on Staten Island, New York, raised in Rome, and trained during her career in Hackensack, New Jersey.

Fontana married American pair skater John Zimmerman on August 28, 2003. The two coach together, and have served as ambassadors for Right to Play. The couple also have a line of sportswear, Karisma, which Fontana founded in 2009. They have representatives selling the clothing line in the United States, especially in the Midwest. Their daughter, Sofia Zimmerman, was born on April 2, 2012, at Northwest Medical Center in Coconut Creek, Florida. Their second daughter, Eva Zimmerman, was born on June 2, 2013, followed by their son Jack Zimmerman born in August 2016.

Programs

Results

References

External links
 

1976 births
Living people
Olympic figure skaters of Italy
Figure skaters at the 2002 Winter Olympics
Figure skaters at the 2006 Winter Olympics
Italian female single skaters
Universiade medalists in figure skating
Sportspeople from Staten Island
Sportspeople from Hackensack, New Jersey
American sportswomen
Universiade bronze medalists for Italy
Competitors at the 2001 Winter Universiade
21st-century American women